Oleh Veremiyenko (born 13 February 1999) is a professional Ukrainian football defender who plays for Rukh Lviv.

Career
Veremiyenko is a product of the UFC Lviv School Sportive System.

He was promoted to the main-squad of FC Karpaty Lviv, but never made his debut in the Ukrainian Premier League and played for reserves. In February 2019 he signed a one-year loan deal with FC Kalush in the Ukrainian Second League.

Honours

International
Veremiyenko was a part of the Ukraine national U-20 football team, that won the 2019 FIFA U-20 World Cup.

Ukraine U20
FIFA U-20 World Cup: 2019

References

External links

1999 births
Living people
Sportspeople from Lviv
Ukrainian footballers
Association football defenders
Ukrainian Premier League players
FC Kalush players
Ukraine youth international footballers
FC Karpaty Lviv players
FC Rukh Lviv players
FC Podillya Khmelnytskyi players
Ukrainian Second League players